Joseph Cassidy Devine (8 September 1905 – 1980) was a Scottish professional footballer born in Motherwell, who played as an inside forward or wing half. He represented Bathgate in the Scottish Football League, and made nearly 350 appearances in the English Football League in England playing for Burnley, Newcastle United, Sunderland, Queens Park Rangers, Birmingham and Chesterfield.

After his playing career, he became manager of Valur and Iceland.

References

 
 

1905 births
1980 deaths
Footballers from Motherwell
Scottish footballers
Association football inside forwards
Bathgate F.C. players
Burnley F.C. players
Newcastle United F.C. players
Sunderland A.F.C. players
Queens Park Rangers F.C. players
Birmingham City F.C. players
Chesterfield F.C. players
English Football League players
Scottish Football League players
Date of death missing
Association football wing halves
Scottish football managers
Scottish expatriate football managers
Valur (men's football) managers
Expatriate football managers in Iceland
Iceland national football team managers